Thomas Mitchell Buffington was born October 15, 1855, in Going Snake District of the Cherokee Nation, Indian Territory, now in Adair County, Oklahoma. His parents were Ezekiel Buffington, who was born in Georgia in 1807 and settled in Oklahoma Territory in 1835 as part of the Cherokee diaspora. His mother was Louisa (Newman) Buffington, who was born in Tennessee in 1817 and died in 1898. Buffington was one of eight children. Buffington married Susie Woodall in 1878 (b.1857-d.1891); she was a school teacher. Four years after his first wife's death, he married E. Gray, a teacher in the Cherokee schools.

Thomas Buffington became active in Cherokee politics and aligned himself with the Downing party. In 1889 he was elected district judge for the Delaware district, but resigned in order to serve as senator, for which he was elected in 1891. He served as temporary Principal Chief of the Cherokee Nation from the 14th to the 23rd of December, 1891, upon the deaths of the Principal Chief Joel B. Mayes and the Second Chief Henry Chambers, as he had right of succession, being president of the Senate. He was appointed as a delegate to Washington, D.C. to represent the Cherokee Nation before the United States Congress. There he supported passage of the Curtis Act of 1898, which weakened tribal governments, brought all persons in the territory under federal law, and facilitated land allotments.

He later served as mayor of Vinita. In 1899 he resigned as mayor and ran for the office of Principal Chief and won, serving until 1903.

After serving as Principal Chief for the second time, Buffington served as mayor of Vinita till 1917. He died in Vinita, Oklahoma on February 11, 1938.

References

1855 births
1938 deaths
Cherokee Nation politicians (1794–1907)
Cherokee Nation mayors in Oklahoma
Mayors of places in Oklahoma
Principal Chiefs of the Cherokee Nation (1794–1907)
20th-century Native Americans